VNR could stand for:
 Vale of Neath Railway 
 Hungarian People's Republic, Russian transliteration of Vengerskaya Narodnaya Respublika (satellite state of the Soviet Union)
 Video news release 
 Vomeronasal receptor, GPCR receptor